Ioannis Damanakis (Greek: Ιωάννης Δαμανάκης; born 2 October 1952) is a retired Greek footballer.

Career
He started his career at Chania, and after 6 years he was transferred to PAOK FC. He played 242 league games for PAOK, winning the Alpha Ethniki championship in 1985. He earned 24 caps and scored 1 goal for the Greece national football team, and participated in UEFA Euro 1980.

External links 

1952 births
Living people
Greek footballers
Greece international footballers
Makedonikos F.C. players
PAOK FC players
UEFA Euro 1980 players
Super League Greece players
AO Chania F.C. players
Association football midfielders
Footballers from Chania